Boulevard of Broken Dreams is a 1988 Australian film. It was the first movie from Boulevard Films.

Plot
A successful Australian writer discovers he has cancer and returns home to Melbourne to be with his estranged wife and daughter.

Production
Producer-writer Frank Howson met Pino Amenta when discussing a possible mini-series about Les Darcy. That was never made but they decided to collaborate on this film.

Howson later said, "It was the first film we'd done, and it was made with a lot of commercial requirements because we weren't in the position to just make a film and hope for the best. We set out to make a film that would do well here and internationally."

Among these decisions was the ending. Originally, John Waters' character was to get on a plane to Los Angeles without anyone knowing that he returned home to die. In the final film, though, he was reunited with his wife and child.

Howson placed a great emphasis on music for the movie:
We recorded a great deal of those songs in LA with people like Richie Havens, Dan Hill, and Marc Jordan. On most Australian productions, the soundtrack tends to be done last and usually at a stage when they have almost run out of money. It suffers as a result. To me, the soundtrack is one of the most important things for the emotional balance of a film.

Soundtrack
The soundtrack album was released in 1988 through CBS. It earned songwriters Frank Howson, John Capek, Beeb Birtles and David Scofield a nomination for the 1989 ARIA Award for Best Original Soundtrack, Cast or Show Album.

 Boulevard of Broken Dreams (Frank Howson/John Capek/Marc Jordan) – Marc Jordan.
 Breathless (Howson/Capek) – Renee Geyer.
 Dreams (Howson/Beeb Birtles) – Beeb Birtles.
 Under Fire (Howson/Capek) – Marc Jordan.
 The Heart Is A Lonely Hunter (Howson/Capek) – Stephen Cummings.
 We Had It All (Dan Hill/Capek/Howson) – Dan Hill.
 Somewhere in the Night (Howson/Capek) – Vanetta Fields.
 True Love Ways (Buddy Holly/Norman Petty) – Buddy Holly.
 I Could Have Been A Hero (Howson/David Schofield) – Frank Howson.
 One Good Reason (Howson/Capek) – Richie Havens.
 Tom Traubert's Blues (Tom Waits) – Tom Waits.

Reception
John Waters earned an AFI Award for Best Actor and the film was popular enough for Boulevard Films to secure funding for a further five movies. Reviews were mostly poor.

References

External links
 
 Boulevard of Broken Dreams at Oz Movies

Australian drama films
1988 films
1980s English-language films
1980s Australian films